New TT Hellenic Postbank was a commercial bank based in Athens, in Greece. In 2013 the Eurobank Group acquired New TT Hellenic Postbank S.A.. The operational integration of New TT Hellenic Postbank was completed in May 2014, while Eurobank decided to keep the branch network distinct, under the brand name “New TT Branch Network”.

See also
Postal savings system

References

External links 
  Eurobank official website: 

Defunct banks of Greece
Banks established in 2013
Greek companies established in 2013